King of the Stallions is a 1942 American Western film directed by Edward Finney and written by Arthur St. Claire and Sherman L. Lowe. The film stars Chief Thundercloud, Rick Vallin, Barbara Felker, Dave O'Brien, Chief Yowlachie and Sally Cairns. The film was released on September 18, 1942, by Monogram Pictures.

Plot
Nakoma is the leader of a pack of wild horses, both Indians and cowboys want the horse in their side, however Nakoma is not friendly to either one.

Cast      
Chief Thundercloud as Hahawi   
Rick Vallin as Sina-Oga 
Barbara Felker as Princess Telenika     
Dave O'Brien as Steve Mason
Chief Yowlachie as Chief Matapotan
Sally Cairns as Lucy Clark
Ted Adams as Jake Barlow
Gordon De Main as Pop Clark
Forrest Taylor as Nick Henshaw
J.W. Cody as Manka

References

External links
 

1942 films
American Western (genre) films
1942 Western (genre) films
Monogram Pictures films
American black-and-white films
Films directed by Edward Finney
1940s English-language films
1940s American films